Ralph Albert Hamilton (June 10, 1921 – June 5, 1983) was an American professional basketball player. He played for the Fort Wayne Pistons and Indianapolis Jets of the National Basketball League and the Basketball Association of America (BAA), precursors to the modern day National Basketball Association (NBA). Hamilton was traded by the Pistons to the Jets in December 1948.

Hamilton, a native of Fort Wayne, Indiana, played collegiately at Indiana University in Bloomington. He played for the Hoosiers in 1941–42 and 1942–43 (his sophomore and junior years, respectively) but then served in the United States Army for three years during the end of World War II. When he came back as a 25-year-old senior in 1946–47, he served as team captain and led them in scoring, was named First Team All-Big Ten Conference and was dubbed a consensus First Team All-American. He also scored nearly 1,000 points during his staggered college career.

Hamilton died in 1983 just shy of his 62nd birthday.

BAA career statistics

Regular season

References

External links

Photo of Ralph Hamilton

1921 births
1983 deaths
All-American college men's basketball players
American men's basketball players
Basketball players from Fort Wayne, Indiana
Fort Wayne Zollner Pistons players
Fort Wayne Pistons players
Forwards (basketball)
Guards (basketball)
Indiana Hoosiers men's basketball players
Indianapolis Jets players
Undrafted National Basketball Association players
United States Army personnel of World War II